Sophronica calceoides is a species of beetle in the family Cerambycidae. It was described by Lepesme & Stephan von Breuning in 1952.

References

Sophronica
Beetles described in 1952